The Finnish Tour is a developmental professional golf tour based in Finland. In the past, similar to the Danish Golf Tour and the Swedish Golf Tour, most events on the Finnish Tour schedules were incorporated into the Nordic Golf League, one of the four third-tier tours recognized by the European Tour. However, most tournaments are now independent Finnish Tour events.

Many players from the Finnish Tour have progressed through the tour, eventually playing and winning on the European Tour. Notable players include Mikko Korhonen, Kalle Samooja and Sami Välimäki.

History
The tour was founded in 2002 by the Finnish Golf Association and the PGA of Finland. The tour aims to offer Finland's best players (both male and female) the opportunity to compete against each other at a high level.

In 2014, the tour signed a title-sponsor agreement with German car manufacturer Audi, becoming the Audi Finnish Tour. The deal finished in 2016.

2023 season

Schedule
The following table lists official events during the 2023 season.

2022 season

Schedule
The following table lists official events during the 2021 season.

Order of Merit
The Order of Merit was based on prize money won during the season, calculated using a points-based system.

2021 season

Schedule
The following table lists official events during the 2021 season.

Order of Merit
The Order of Merit was based on prize money won during the season, calculated using a points-based system.

2020 season

Schedule
The following table lists official events during the 2020 season.

Order of Merit
The Order of Merit was based on prize money won during the season, calculated using a points-based system.

2019 season

Schedule
The following table lists official events during the 2019 season.

Order of Merit
The Order of Merit was based on prize money won during the season, calculated using a points-based system.

2018 season

Schedule
The following table lists official events during the 2018 season.

Order of Merit
The Order of Merit was based on prize money won during the season, calculated using a points-based system.

2017 season

Schedule
The following table lists official events during the 2017 season.

Order of Merit
The Order of Merit was based on prize money won during the season, calculated using a points-based system.

2016 season

Schedule
The following table lists official events during the 2016 season.

Order of Merit
The Order of Merit was based on prize money won during the season, calculated using a points-based system.

2015 season

Schedule
The following table lists official events during the 2015 season.

Order of Merit
The Order of Merit was based on prize money won during the season, calculated using a points-based system.

2014 season

Schedule
The following table lists official events during the 2014 season.

Order of Merit
The Order of Merit was based on prize money won during the season, calculated using a points-based system.

2013 season

Schedule
The following table lists official events during the 2013 season.

Order of Merit
The Order of Merit was based on prize money won during the season, calculated using a points-based system.

2012 season

Schedule
The following table lists official events during the 2012 season.

Order of Merit
The Order of Merit was based on prize money won during the season, calculated using a points-based system.

2011 season

Schedule
The following table lists official events during the 2011 season.

Order of Merit
The Order of Merit was based on prize money won during the season, calculated using a points-based system.

2010 season

Schedule
The following table lists official events during the 2010 season.

Order of Merit
The Order of Merit was based on prize money won during the season, calculated using a points-based system.

2009 season

Schedule
The following table lists official events during the 2009 season.

Order of Merit
The Order of Merit was based on prize money won during the season, calculated using a points-based system.

2008 season

Schedule
The following table lists official events during the 2008 season.

Order of Merit
The Order of Merit was based on prize money won during the season, calculated using a points-based system.

2007 season

Schedule
The following table lists official events during the 2007 season.

Order of Merit
The Order of Merit was based on prize money won during the season, calculated using a points-based system.

2006 season

Schedule
The following table lists official events during the 2006 season.

Order of Merit
The Order of Merit was based on prize money won during the season, calculated using a points-based system.

2005 season

Schedule
The following table lists official events during the 2005 season.

Order of Merit
The Order of Merit was based on prize money won during the season, calculated using a points-based system.

2004 season

Schedule
The following table lists official events during the 2004 season.

Order of Merit
The Order of Merit was based on prize money won during the season, calculated using a points-based system.

2003 season

Schedule
The following table lists official events during the 2003 season.

Order of Merit
The Order of Merit was based on prize money won during the season, calculated using a points-based system.

2002 season

Schedule
The following table lists official events during the 2002 season.

Order of Merit
The Order of Merit was based on prize money won during the season, calculated using a points-based system.

Order of Merit winners

See also
 Danish Golf Tour
 Nordic Golf League
 Norwegian Golf Tour
 Swedish Golf Tour

Notes

References

External links
  

Professional golf tours
Golf in Finland
Finnish Tour
2002 establishments in Finland